A molten salt reactor (MSR) is a class of nuclear fission reactor in which the primary nuclear reactor coolant and/or the fuel is a molten salt mixture. Only two MSRs have ever operated, both research reactors in the United States. The 1950's Aircraft Reactor Experiment was primarily motivated by the compact size that the technique offers, while the 1960's Molten-Salt Reactor Experiment aimed to prove the concept of a nuclear power plant which implements a thorium fuel cycle in a breeder reactor.

MSRs are considered safer than conventional reactors because they operate with fuel already in a molten state. In most designs, the fuel mixture is designed to drain from the core to a containment vessel in emergency scenarios, where it will solidify in fuel drain tanks. In addition, the use of molten salt coolant prevents the evolution of hydrogen gas possible in water cooled reactors. This eliminates the risk of hydrogen explosions (as in the Fukushima nuclear disaster). They operate at or close to atmospheric pressure, rather than the 75-150 times atmospheric pressure of a typical light-water reactor (LWR), hence reducing the need for large, expensive reactor pressure vessels used in LWRs. Another advantage of MSRs is that the gaseous fission products (Xe and Kr) do not have much solubility in the fuel salt, and can be safely captured as they bubble out of the molten fuel, rather than increasing the pressure inside the fuel tubes over the life of the fuel, as happens in conventional solid-fueled reactors.  MSR's can also be refueled while operating (essentially online-nuclear reprocessing) while conventional reactors must be shut down for refueling (Pressure tube heavy water reactors like the CANDU or the Atucha-class PHWRs, and British-built Gas-cooled Reactors (Magnox, AGR) being notable exceptions).

Relevant design challenges include the corrosivity of hot salts and the changing chemical composition of the salt as it is transmuted by the neutron flux in the reactor core.

MSRs offer multiple advantages over conventional nuclear power plants, although for historical reasons they have not been deployed.

Properties
MSRs, especially those with fuel in the molten salt, differ considerably from conventional reactors. Operating pressures can be much lower, and the temperatures higher. In this respect an MSR is more similar to a liquid metal cooled reactor than to a conventional light water cooled reactor. MSRs are often planned as breeding reactors with a closed fuel cycle—as opposed to the once-through fuel currently used in U.S. nuclear reactors.

Safety concepts rely on a negative temperature coefficient of reactivity and a large allowable temperature rise to limit reactivity excursions. For designs with the fuel in the salt, the salt thermally expands immediately with power excursions, as opposed to conventional reactors in which the negative coefficient of reactivity is delayed since the heat from the fuel must be transferred to the moderator. As an additional method for shutdown, a separate, passively cooled container below the reactor can be included. Fuel is drained from the reactor into the container in accident scenarios or for regular maintenance. This stops the nuclear reaction and acts as a second cooling system. Neutron-producing accelerators have been proposed for some super-safe subcritical experimental designs.

The temperatures of some proposed designs are high enough to produce process heat for hydrogen production or other chemical reactions. Because of this, they are included in the GEN-IV roadmap for further study.

Advantages
MSRs offer many potential advantages over current light water reactors:
As in all low-pressure reactor designs, passive decay heat removal is achieved in MSRs.  In some designs, the fuel and the coolant are the same fluid, so a loss of coolant removes the reactor's fuel, similar to how loss of coolant also removes the moderator in LWRs. Unlike steam, fluoride salts dissolve poorly in water, and do not form burnable hydrogen. Unlike steel and solid uranium oxide, molten salts are not damaged by the core's neutron bombardment, though the reactor vessel still is.
A low-pressure MSR lacks a boiling water reactor's (BWR) high-pressure radioactive steam, obviating the expensive containment, steel core vessel, piping, and safety equipment needed to contain it. However, most MSR designs require radioactive fission product-containing fluid in direct contact with pumps and heat exchangers.
MSRs may make closed nuclear fuel cycles cheaper because they can operate with slow neutrons. If fully implemented, any reactor that closes the nuclear fuel cycle reduces environmental impacts: Chemical separation turns long-lived actinides back into reactor fuel. The discharged wastes are mostly fission products (nuclear ashes) with shorter half-lives. This reduces the needed geologic containment to 300 years rather than the tens of thousands of years needed by a light-water reactor's spent nuclear fuel. It also permits the use of alternate nuclear fuels, such as thorium.
The fuel's liquid phase might be pyroprocessed to separate fission products (nuclear ashes) from actinide fuels. This may have advantages over conventional reprocessing, though much development is still needed.
Fuel rod fabrication is replaced with fuel salt synthesis.
Some designs are compatible with the fast neutron spectrum, which can "burn" problematic transuranic elements like Pu240, Pu241 and up (reactor grade plutonium) from traditional light-water nuclear reactors.
An MSR can react to load changes in under 60 seconds (unlike "traditional" solid-fuel nuclear power plants that suffer from xenon poisoning).
Molten salt reactors can run at high temperatures, yielding high thermal efficiency. This reduces size, expense, and environmental impacts.
MSRs can offer a high "specific power," that is high power at a low mass as demonstrated by ARE.
A possibly good neutron economy makes the MSR attractive for the neutron-poor thorium fuel cycle

Disadvantages

In circulating-fuel-salt designs, radionuclides dissolved in fuel come in contact with major equipment such as pumps and heat exchangers, likely requiring fully remote and possibly expensive maintenance. 
Some MSRs require onsite chemical processing to manage core mixture and remove fission products.
Required regulatory changes to deal with radically different design features
Some MSR designs rely on expensive nickel-based alloys to hold the molten salt. Alloys based on nickel and iron are prone to embrittlement under high neutron flux.
Corrosion risk. Molten salts require careful management of their redox state to handle corrosion risks. This is particularly challenging for circulating-fuel-salt designs, in which a complex mix of fissile/fertile isotopes and their transmutation/fission/decay products is being circulated through the reactor. Static fuel salt designs profit from modularising the problem: the fuel salt is contained within fuel pins whose regular replacement, primarily due to neutron irradiation damage, is part of the operating concept; while the coolant salt has a simpler chemical composition and, under appropriate redox state management, does not pose a corrosion risk either to the fuel pins or to the reactor vessel. (Regarding redox state management, see the descriptions for the stable salt reactor's fuel and coolant salts). Neutron radiation can also transmute other common alloying agents such as Co and Ni, shortening lifespan. If using lithium salts (e.g. FLiBe), it is preferable, if expensive, to use  to reduce tritium generation (tritium can permeate stainless steels, cause embrittlement, and escape into the environment). ORNL developed Hastelloy N to help address these issues, and there is an effort to certify other structural steels for use in reactors (316H, 800H, inco 617).
Some MSR designs might be modified to make a breeder reactor able to produce weapons-grade nuclear material.
The MSRE and ARE used high enrichment levels approaching the levels of nuclear weapons. These levels would be illegal in most modern regulatory regimes for power plants. Most modern designs avoid this issue.
Neutron damage to solid moderator materials can limit the core lifetime of an MSR that uses moderated thermal neutrons. For example, the MSRE was designed so that its graphite moderator had very loose tolerances, so neutron damage could change their size without damage. "Two fluid" MSR designs are unable to use graphite piping because graphite changes size when  bombarded with neutrons, so graphite pipes would crack and leak. MSR using fast neutrons cannot use graphite anyway to avoid moderation.
Thermal MSRs have lower breeding ratios than fast-neutron breeders, though their doubling time may be shorter.

Coolant 
MSRs can be cooled in various ways, including using molten salts.

Molten-salt-cooled solid-fuel reactors are variously called "molten salt reactor system" in the Generation IV proposal, molten salt converter reactors (MSCR), advanced high-temperature reactors (AHTRs), or fluoride high-temperature reactors (FHR, preferred DOE designation).

FHRs cannot reprocess fuel easily and have fuel rods that need to be fabricated and validated, requiring up to twenty years from project inception. FHR retains the safety and cost advantages of a low-pressure, high-temperature coolant, also shared by liquid metal cooled reactors. Notably, steam is not created in the core (as is present in BWRs), and no large, expensive steel pressure vessel (as required for PWRs). Since it can operate at high temperatures, the conversion of the heat to electricity can use an efficient, lightweight Brayton cycle gas turbine.

Much of the current research on FHRs is focused on small, compact heat exchangers that reduce molten salt volumes and associated costs.

Molten salts can be highly corrosive and corrosivity increases with temperature. For the primary cooling loop, a material is needed that can withstand corrosion at high temperatures and intense radiation. Experiments show that Hastelloy-N and similar alloys are suited to these tasks at operating temperatures up to about 700 °C. However, operating experience is limited. Still higher operating temperatures are desirable—at  thermochemical production of hydrogen becomes possible. Materials for this temperature range have not been validated, though carbon composites, molybdenum alloys (e.g. TZM), carbides, and refractory metal based or ODS alloys might be feasible.

A workaround suggested by a private researcher is to use the new beta-titanium Au alloys as this would also allow extreme temperature operation as well as increasing the safety margin.

Fused salt selection

The salt mixtures are chosen to make the reactor safer and more practical.

Fluorine 
Fluorine has only one stable isotope, and does not easily become radioactive under neutron bombardment. Compared to chlorine and other halides, fluorine also absorbs fewer neutrons and slows ("moderates") neutrons better. Low-valence fluorides boil at high temperatures, though many pentafluorides and hexafluorides boil at low temperatures. They must be very hot before they break down into their constituent elements. Such molten salts are "chemically stable" when maintained well below their boiling points. Fluoride salts dissolve poorly in water, and do not form burnable hydrogen.

Chlorine 

Chlorides permit fast breeder reactors to be constructed. Much less research has been done on reactor designs using chloride salts.

Lithium 
Lithium must be in the form of purified , because  effectively captures neutrons and produces tritium. Even if pure 7Li is used, salts containing lithium cause significant tritium production, comparable with heavy water reactors.

Mixtures 
Reactor salts are usually close to eutectic mixtures to reduce their melting point. A low melting point simplifies melting the salt at startup and reduces the risk of the salt freezing as it is cooled in the heat exchanger.

Due to the high "redox window" of fused fluoride salts, the redox potential of the fused salt system can be changed. Fluorine-lithium-beryllium ("FLiBe") can be used with beryllium additions to lower the redox potential and nearly eliminate corrosion. However, since beryllium is extremely toxic, special precautions must be engineered into the design to prevent its release into the environment. Many other salts can cause plumbing corrosion, especially if the reactor is hot enough to make highly reactive hydrogen.

To date, most research has focused on FLiBe, because lithium and beryllium are reasonably effective moderators and form a eutectic salt mixture with a lower melting point than each of the constituent salts. Beryllium also performs neutron doubling, improving the neutron economy. This process occurs when the beryllium nucleus emits two neutrons after absorbing a single neutron. For the fuel carrying salts, generally 1% or 2% (by mole) of UF4 is added. Thorium and plutonium fluorides have also been used.

Fused salt purification
Techniques for preparing and handling molten salt were first developed at ORNL. The purpose of salt purification is to eliminate oxides, sulfur and metal impurities. Oxides could result in the deposition of solid particles in reactor operation. Sulfur must be removed because of its corrosive attack on nickel-based alloys at operational temperature. Structural metal such as chromium, nickel, and iron must be removed for corrosion control.
 
A water content reduction purification stage using HF and helium sweep gas was specified to run at 400 °C. Oxide and sulfur contamination in the salt mixtures were removed using gas sparging of HF – H2 mixture, with the salt heated to 600 °C. Structural metal contamination in the salt mixtures were removed using hydrogen gas sparging, at 700 °C. Solid ammonium hydrofluoride was proposed as a safer alternative for oxide removal.

Fused salt processing
The possibility of online processing can be an MSR advantage. Continuous processing would reduce the inventory of fission products, control corrosion and improve neutron economy by removing fission products with high neutron absorption cross-section, especially xenon. This makes the MSR particularly suited to the neutron-poor thorium fuel cycle. Online fuel processing can introduce risks of fuel processing accidents, which can trigger release of radio isotopes.

In some thorium breeding scenarios, the intermediate product protactinium  would be removed from the reactor and allowed to decay into highly pure , an attractive bomb-making material. More modern designs propose to use a lower specific power or a separate thorium breeding blanket. This dilutes the protactinium to such an extent that few protactinium atoms absorb a second neutron or, via a (n, 2n) reaction (in which an incident neutron is not absorbed but instead knocks a neutron out of the nucleus), generate . Because  has a short half-life and its decay chain contains hard gamma emitters, it makes the isotopic mix of uranium less attractive for bomb-making. This benefit would come with the added expense of a larger fissile inventory or a 2-fluid design with a large quantity of blanket salt.

The necessary fuel salt reprocessing technology has been demonstrated, but only at laboratory scale. A prerequisite to full-scale commercial reactor design is the R&D to engineer an economically competitive fuel salt cleaning system.

Fuel reprocessing 

Reprocessing refers to the chemical separation of fissionable uranium and plutonium from spent fuel. Such recovery could increase the risk of nuclear proliferation. In the United States the regulatory regime has varied dramatically across administrations.

Costs and economics 
A systematic literature review from 2020 concludes that there is very limited information on economics and finance of MSRs, with low quality of the information and that cost estimations are uncertain.

In the specific case of the stable salt reactor (SSR) where the radioactive fuel is contained as a molten salt within fuel pins and the primary circuit is not radioactive, operating costs are likely to be lower.

Types of molten salt reactors 
While many design variants have been proposed, there are three main categories regarding the role of molten salt:

The use of molten salt as fuel and as coolant are independent design choices - the original circulating-fuel-salt MSRE and the more recent static-fuel-salt SSR use salt as fuel and salt as coolant; the DFR uses salt as fuel but metal as coolant; and the FHR has solid fuel but salt as coolant.

Designs 
MSRs can be burners or breeders. They can be fast or thermal or epithermal. Thermal reactors typically employ a moderator (usually graphite) to slow the neutrons down and moderate temperature. They can accept a variety of fuels (low-enriched uranium, thorium, depleted uranium, waste products) and coolants (fluoride, chloride, lithium, beryllium, mixed). Fuel cycle can be either closed or once-through. They can be monolithic or modular, large or small. The reactor can adopt a loop, modular or integral configuration. Variations include:

Molten salt fast reactor 
The molten salt fast reactor (MSFR) is a proposed design with the fuel dissolved in a fluoride salt coolant. The MSFR is one of the two variants of MSRs selected by the Generation IV International Forum (GIF) for further development, the other being the FHR or AHTR. The MSFR is based on a fast neutron spectrum and is believed to be a long-term substitute to solid-fueled fast reactors. They have been studied for almost a decade, mainly by calculations and determination of basic physical and chemical properties in the European Union and Russian Federation. A MSFR is regarded sustainable because there are no fuel shortages. Operation of a MSFR does in theory not generate or require large amounts of transuranic (TRU) elements. When steady state is achieved in a MSFR, there is no longer a need for uranium enrichment facilities.

MSFRs may be breeder reactors. They operate without a moderator in the core such as graphite, so graphite life-span is no longer a problem. This results in a breeder reactor with a fast neutron spectrum that operates in the Thorium fuel cycle. MSFRs contain relatively small initial inventories of 233U. MSFRs run on liquid fuel with no solid matter inside the core. This leads to the possibility of reaching specific power that is much higher than reactors using solid fuel. The heat produced goes directly into the heat transfer fluid. In the MSFR, a small amount of molten salt is set aside to be processed for fission product removal and then returned to the reactor. This gives MSFRs the capability of reprocessing the fuel without stopping the reactor. This is very different compared to solid-fueled reactors because they have separate facilities to produce the solid fuel and process spent nuclear fuel. The MSFR can operate using a large variety of fuel compositions due to its on-line fuel control and flexible fuel processing.

The standard MSFR would be a 3000 MWth reactor that has a total fuel salt volume of 18 m3 with a mean fuel temperature of 750 oC. The core's shape is a compact cylinder with a height to diameter ratio of 1 where liquid fluoride fuel salt flows from the bottom to the top. The return circulation of the salt, from top to bottom, is broken up into 16 groups of pumps and heat exchangers located around the core. The fuel salt takes approximately 3 to 4 seconds to complete a full cycle. At any given time during operation, half of the total fuel salt volume is in the core and the rest is in the external fuel circuit (salt collectors, salt-bubble separators, fuel heat exchangers, pumps, salt injectors and pipes). MSFRs contain an emergency draining system that is triggered and achieved by redundant and reliable devices such as detection and opening technology. During operation, the fuel salt circulation speed can be adjusted by controlling the power of the pumps in each sector. The intermediate fluid circulation speed can be adjusted by controlling the power of the intermediate circuit pumps. The temperature of the intermediate fluid in the intermediate exchangers can be managed through the use of a double bypass. This allows the temperature of the intermediate fluid at the conversion exchanger inlet to be held constant while its temperature is increased in a controlled way at the inlet of the intermediate exchangers. The temperature of the core can be adjusted by varying the proportion of bubbles injected in the core since it reduces the salt density. As a result, it reduces the mean temperature of the fuel salt. Usually the fuel salt temperature can be brought down by 100 oC using a 3% proportion of bubbles. MSFRs have two draining modes, controlled routine draining and emergency draining. During controlled routine draining, fuel salt is transferred to actively cooled storage tanks. The fuel temperature can be lowered before draining, this may slow down the process. This type of draining could be done every 1 to 5 years when the sectors are replaced. Emergency draining is done when an irregularity occurs during operation. The fuel salt can be drained directly into the emergency draining tank either by active devices or by passive means. The draining must be fast to limit the fuel salt heating in a loss of heat removal event.

Fluoride salt-cooled high-temperature reactor 
The fluoride salt-cooled high-temperature reactor (FHR), also called advanced high temperature reactor (AHTR), is also a proposed Generation IV molten salt reactor variant regarded promising for the long-term future. The FHR/AHTR reactor uses a solid-fuel system along with a molten fluoride salt as coolant.

One version of the Very-high-temperature reactor (VHTR) under study was the liquid-salt very-high-temperature reactor (LS-VHTR). It uses liquid salt as a coolant in the primary loop, rather than a single helium loop. It relies on "TRISO" fuel dispersed in graphite. Early AHTR research focused on graphite in the form of graphite rods that would be inserted in hexagonal moderating graphite blocks, but current studies focus primarily on pebble-type fuel. The LS-VHTR can work at very high temperatures (the boiling point of most molten salt candidates is >1400 °C); low-pressure cooling that can be used to match hydrogen production facility conditions (most thermochemical cycles require temperatures in excess of 750 °C); better electric conversion efficiency than a helium-cooled VHTR operating in similar conditions; passive safety systems and better retention of fission products in the event of an accident.

Liquid fluoride thorium reactor 

Reactors containing molten thorium salt, called liquid fluoride thorium reactors (LFTR), would tap the thorium fuel cycle. Private companies from Japan, Russia, Australia and the United States, and the Chinese government, have expressed interest in developing this technology.

Advocates estimate that five hundred metric tons of thorium could supply U.S. energy needs for one year. The U.S. Geological Survey estimates that the largest-known U.S. thorium deposit, the Lemhi Pass district on the Montana-Idaho border, contains thorium reserves of 64,000 metric tons.

Traditionally, these reactors were known as molten salt breeder reactors (MSBRs) or thorium molten salt reactors (TMSRs), but the name LFTR was promoted as a rebrand in the early 2000s by Kirk Sorensen.

Stable salt reactor 

The stable salt reactor is a relatively recent concept which holds the molten salt fuel statically in traditional LWR fuel pins. Pumping of the fuel salt, and all the corrosion/deposition/maintenance/containment issues arising from circulating a highly radioactive, hot and chemically complex fluid, are no longer required. The fuel pins are immersed in a separate, non-fissionable fluoride salt which acts as primary coolant.

Dual-fluid molten salt reactors 
A prototypical example of a dual fluid reactor is the lead-cooled, salt-fueled reactor.

History

1950s

Aircraft Reactor Experiment, US 

MSR research started with the U.S. Aircraft Reactor Experiment (ARE) in support of the U.S. Aircraft Nuclear Propulsion program. ARE was a 2.5 MWth nuclear reactor experiment designed to attain a high energy density for use as an engine in a nuclear-powered bomber.

The project included experiments, including high temperature and engine tests collectively called the Heat Transfer Reactor Experiments: HTRE-1, HTRE-2 and HTRE-3 at the National Reactor Test Station (now Idaho National Laboratory) as well as an experimental high-temperature molten salt reactor at Oak Ridge National Laboratory – the ARE.

ARE used molten fluoride salt NaF-ZrF4-UF4 (53-41-6 mol%) as fuel, moderated by beryllium oxide (BeO). Liquid sodium was a secondary coolant.

The experiment had a peak temperature of 860 °C. It produced 100 MWh over nine days in 1954. This experiment used Inconel 600 alloy for the metal structure and piping.

An MSR was operated at the Critical Experiments Facility of the Oak Ridge National Laboratory in 1957. It was part of the circulating-fuel reactor program of the Pratt & Whitney Aircraft Company (PWAC). This was called Pratt and Whitney Aircraft Reactor-1 (PWAR-1). The experiment was run for a few weeks and at essentially zero power, although it reached criticality. The PWAR-1 used NaF-ZrF4-UF4 as the primary fuel and coolant. It was one of three critical MSRs ever built.

1960s and 1970s

MSRE at Oak Ridge, US 

Oak Ridge National Laboratory (ORNL) took the lead in researching MSRs through the 1960s. Much of their work culminated with the Molten-Salt Reactor Experiment (MSRE). MSRE was a 7.4 MWth test reactor simulating the neutronic "kernel" of a type of epithermal thorium molten salt breeder reactor called the liquid fluoride thorium reactor (LFTR). The large (expensive) breeding blanket of thorium salt was omitted in favor of neutron measurements.

MSRE's piping, core vat and structural components were made from Hastelloy-N, moderated by pyrolytic graphite. It went critical in 1965 and ran for four years. Its fuel was LiF-BeF2-ZrF4-UF4 (65-29-5-1)mol%. The graphite core moderated it. Its secondary coolant was FLiBe (2LiF-BeF2).

Theoretical designs at Oak Ridge, US

Molten salt breeder reactor
From 1970 to 1976 ORNL researched during the 1970–1976 a molten salt breeder reactor (MSBR) design. Fuel was to be LiF-BeF2-ThF4-UF4 (72-16-12-0.4)mol% with graphite moderator. The secondary coolant was to be NaF-NaBF4. Its peak operating temperature was to be . It would follow a 4-year replacement schedule. The MSR program closed down in the early 1970s in favor of the liquid metal fast-breeder reactor (LMFBR), after which research stagnated in the United States. , ARE and MSRE remained the only molten-salt reactors ever operated.

The MSBR project received funding from 1968 to 1976 of (in  dollars) $.

Officially, the program was cancelled because:
 The political and technical support for the program in the United States was too thin geographically. Within the United States the technology was well understood only in Oak Ridge.
 The MSR program was in competition with the fast breeder program at the time, which got an early start and had copious government development funds with contracts that benefited many parts of the country. When the MSR development program had progressed far enough to justify an expanded program leading to commercial development, the United States Atomic Energy Commission (AEC) could not justify the diversion of substantial funds from the LMFBR to a competing program.

Denatured molten salt reactor
The denatured molten salt reactor (DMSR) was an Oak Ridge theoretical design that was never built.

Engel et al 1980 said the project "examine[ the conceptual feasibility of a molten-salt power reactor fueled with denatured uranium-235 (i.e. with low-enriched uranium) and operated with a minimum of chemical processing." The main design priority was proliferation resistance. Although the DMSR can theoretically be fueled partially by thorium or plutonium, fueling solely with low enriched uranium (LEU) helps maximize proliferation resistance.

Other goals of the DMSR were to minimize research and development and to maximize feasibility. The Generation IV international Forum (GIF) includes "salt processing" as a technology gap for molten salt reactors. The DMSR design theoretically requires minimal chemical processing because it is a burner rather than a breeder.

United Kingdom 

The UK's Atomic Energy Research Establishment (AERE) was developing an alternative MSR design across its National Laboratories at Harwell, Culham, Risley and Winfrith. AERE opted to focus on a lead-cooled 2.5 GWe Molten Salt Fast Reactor (MSFR) concept using a chloride. They also researched helium gas as a coolant.

The UK MSFR would have been fuelled by plutonium, a fuel considered to be 'free' by the program's research scientists, because of the UK's plutonium stockpile.

Despite their different designs, ORNL and AERE maintained contact during this period with information exchange and expert visits. Theoretical work on the concept was conducted between 1964 and 1966, while experimental work was ongoing between 1968 and 1973. The program received annual government funding of around £100,000–£200,000 (equivalent to £2m–£3m in 2005). This funding came to an end in 1974, partly due to the success of the Prototype Fast Reactor at Dounreay which was considered a priority for funding as it went critical in the same year.

Soviet Union 

In the USSR, a molten-salt reactor research program was started in the second half of the 1970s at the Kurchatov Institute. It included theoretical and experimental studies, particularly the investigation of mechanical, corrosion and radiation properties of the molten salt container materials. The main findings supported the conclusion that no physical nor technological obstacles prevented the practical implementation of MSRs.

Twenty-first century 
MSR interest resumed in the new millennium due to continuing delays in fusion power and other nuclear power programs and increasing demand for energy sources that would incur minimal greenhouse gas (GHG) emissions.

Commercial/national/international projects

Canada 

Terrestrial Energy, a Canadian-based company, is developing a DMSR design called the Integral Molten Salt Reactor (IMSR). The IMSR is designed to be deployable as a small modular reactor (SMR). Their design currently undergoing licensing is 400MW thermal (190MW electrical). With high operating temperatures, the IMSR has applications in industrial heat markets as well as traditional power markets. The main design features include neutron moderation from graphite, fueling with low-enriched uranium and a compact and replaceable Core-unit. Decay heat is removed passively using nitrogen (with air as an emergency alternative). The latter feature permits the operational simplicity necessary for industrial deployment.

Terrestrial completed the first phase of a prelicensing review by the Canadian Nuclear Safety Commission in 2017, which provided a regulatory opinion that the design features are generally safe enough to eventually obtain a license to construct the reactor.

China 

China initiated a thorium research project in January 2011, and spent about 3 billion yuan (US$500 million) on it by 2021. A 100 MW demonstrator of the solid fuel version (TMSR-SF), based on pebble bed technology, was planned to be ready by 2024. A 10 MW pilot and a larger demonstrator of the liquid fuel (TMSR-LF) variant were targeted for 2024 and 2035, respectively. China then accelerated its program to build two 12 MW reactors underground at Wuwei research facilities by 2020, beginning with the 2 megawatt TMSR-LF1 prototype. The project sought to test new corrosion-resistant materials. In 2017, ANSTO/Shanghai Institute Of Applied Physics announced the creation of a NiMo-SiC alloy for use in MSRs.

In 2021, China stated that Wuwei prototype operation could start power generation from thorium in September, with a prototype providing energy for around 1,000 homes. It is the world's first nuclear molten salt reactor after the Oak Ridge project. 
The 100 MW successor was expected to be 3 meters tall and 2.5 meters wide, capable of providing energy to 100,000 homes.

Further work on commercial reactors was announced with the target completion date of 2030. Chinese government plans to realize similar reactors in deserts and plains of western China as well as up to 30 in countries involved in China's "Belt and Road" initiative.

In 2022, Shanghai Institute of Applied Physics (SINAP) was given approval by the Ministry of Ecology and Environment to commission an experimental thorium-powered MSR.

Denmark 
Copenhagen Atomics is a Danish molten salt technology company developing mass manufacturable molten salt reactors. The Copenhagen Atomics Waste Burner is a single-fluid, heavy water moderated, fluoride-based, thermal spectrum and autonomously controlled molten salt reactor. This is designed to fit inside of a leak-tight, 40-foot, stainless steel shipping container. The heavy water moderator is thermally insulated from the salt and continuously drained and cooled to below . A molten lithium-7 deuteroxide (7LiOD) moderator version is also being researched. The reactor utilizes the thorium fuel cycle using separated plutonium from spent nuclear fuel as the initial fissile load for the first generation of reactors, eventually transitioning to a thorium breeder. Copenhagen Atomics is actively developing and testing valves, pumps, heat exchangers, measurement systems, salt chemistry and purification systems, and control systems and software for molten salt applications.

Seaborg Technologies is developing the core for a compact molten salt reactor (CMSR). The CMSR is a high temperature, single salt, thermal MSR designed to go critical on commercially available low enriched uranium. The CMSR design is modular, and uses proprietary NaOH moderator. The reactor core is estimated to be replaced every 12 years. During operation, the fuel will not be replaced and will burn for the entire 12-year reactor lifetime. The first version of the Seaborg core is planned to produce 250 MWth power and 100 MWe power. As a power plant, the CMSR will be able to deliver electricity, clean water and heating/cooling to around 200,000 households.

France 

The CNRS project EVOL (Evaluation and viability of liquid fuel fast reactor system) project, with the objective of proposing a design of the molten salt fast reactor (MSFR), released its final report in 2014. Various MSR projects like FHR, MOSART, MSFR, and TMSR have common research and development themes.

The EVOL project will be continued by the EU-funded Safety Assessment of the Molten Salt Fast Reactor (SAMOFAR) project, in which several European research institutes and universities collaborate.

Germany 

The German Institute for Solid State Nuclear Physics in Berlin has proposed the dual fluid reactor as a concept for a fast breeder lead-cooled MSR. The original MSR concept used the fluid salt to provide the fission materials and also to remove the heat. Thus it had problems with the needed flow speed. Using 2 different fluids in separate circles solves the problem.

India 

In 2015, Indian researchers published a MSR design, as an alternative path to thorium-based reactors, according to India's three-stage nuclear power programme.

Indonesia 

Thorcon is developing the TMSR-500 molten salt reactor for the Indonesian market. National Research and Innovation Agency, through its Research Organization for Nuclear Energy announced its renewal of interest on MSR reactor research on 29 March 2022 and planned to study and develop MSR for thorium-fueled nuclear reactors.

Japan 

The Fuji Molten Salt Reactor is a 100 to 200 MWe LFTR, using technology similar to the Oak Ridge project. A consortium including members from Japan, the U.S. and Russia are developing the project. The project would likely take 20 years to develop a full size reactor, but the project seems to lack funding.

Russia 
In 2020, Rosatom announced plans to build a 10 MWth FLiBe burner MSR. It would be fueled by plutonium from reprocessed VVER spent nuclear fuel and fluorides of minor actinides. It is expected to launch in 2031 at Mining and Chemical Combine.

United Kingdom 
The Alvin Weinberg Foundation is a British non-profit organization founded in 2011, dedicated to raising awareness about the potential of thorium energy and LFTR. It was formally launched at the House of Lords on 8 September 2011. It is named after American nuclear physicist Alvin M. Weinberg, who pioneered thorium MSR research.

The stable salt reactor, designed by Moltex Energy, was selected as the most suitable of six MSR designs for UK implementation in a 2015 study commissioned by the UK's innovation agency, Innovate UK. UK government support has been weak, but Moltex has obtained support from New Brunswick Power for the development of a pilot plant in Point Lepreau, Canada, and financial backing from IDOM (an international engineering firm) and is currently engaged in the Canadian Vendor Design Review process.

United States 

Idaho National Laboratory designed  a molten-salt-cooled, molten-salt-fuelled reactor with a prospective output of 1000 MWe.

Kirk Sorensen, former NASA scientist and chief nuclear technologist at Teledyne Brown Engineering, is a long-time promoter of the thorium fuel cycle, coining the term liquid fluoride thorium reactor. In 2011, Sorensen founded Flibe Energy, a company aimed at developing 20–50 MW LFTR reactor designs to power military bases. (It is easier to approve novel military designs than civilian power station designs in the US nuclear regulatory environment).

Transatomic Power pursued what it termed a waste-annihilating molten salt reactor (WAMSR), intended to consume existing spent nuclear fuel, from 2011 until ceasing operation in 2018 and open-sourcing their research.

In January 2016, the United States Department of Energy announced a $80m award fund to develop Generation IV reactor designs. 

One of the two beneficiaries, Southern Company will use the funding to develop a molten chloride fast reactor (MCFR), a type of MSR developed earlier by British scientists.

In 2021, Tennessee Valley Authority (TVA) and Kairos Power announced a TRISO-fueled, fluoride salt-cooled 50MWt test reactor would be deployed at Oak Ridge, Tennessee. Also in 2021, Southern Company, in collaboration with TerraPower and the U.S. Department of Energy announced plans to build the Molten Chloride Reactor Experiment, the first fast-spectrum salt reactor at the Idaho National Laboratory.

Abilene Christian University (ACU) has applied to the US Nuclear Regulatory Commission (NRC) for a construction licence for a 1MWt molten salt research reactor (MSRR), to be built on its campus in Abilene, Texas, as part of the Nuclear Energy eXperimental Testing (NEXT) laboratory. ACU plans for the MSRR to achieve criticality by December 2025.

See also

 Aqueous homogeneous reactor
 Integral fast reactor
 Nuclear aircraft
 Nuclear waste

Notes

References

Further reading
Energy from Thorium's Document Repository Contains scanned versions of many of the U.S. government engineering reports, over ten thousand pages of construction and operation experience. This repository is the main reference for the aircraft reactor experiment and molten-salt fueled reactor's technical discussion.

Bruce Hoglund's Eclectic Interests Home Page Nuclear Power, Thorium, Molten Salt reactors, etc.
Generation IV International Forum MSR website
INL MSR workshop summary

Material Considerations for Molten Salt Accelerator-based Plutonium Conversion Systems J.H. Devan et al.
Nuclear goes retro – with a much greener outlook M. Mitchell Waldrop

External links

Pacific Northwest National Laboratory – Molten Salt Reactor Fundamentals YouTube
International Thorium Energy Organisation – www.IThEO.org

Idaho National Laboratory Molten Salt Reactor Fact Sheet
Energy from Thorium Blog / Website
Google TechTalks – “Liquid Fluoride Thorium Reactor: What Fusion Wanted To Be” by Dr. Joe Bonometti NASA / Naval Postgraduate School YouTube
Pebble Bed Advanced High Temperature Reactor
Thorium Remix LFTR in 5 Minutes and other LFTR Documentaries.
Kun Chen from Chinese Academy of Sciences on China Thorium Molten Salt Reactor TMSR Program
Review of Molten Salt Reactor Technology

 

Graphite moderated reactors
Molten salt reactors